Rebagliati is an Italian surname. Notable people with the surname include:

Chiara Rebagliati (born 1997), Italian archer
Raúl Ferrero Rebagliati (1911–1977), Peruvian politician
Ross Rebagliati (born 1977), Canadian snowboarder

See also
Rabagliati

Italian-language surnames